In mathematics, the excluded point topology is a topology where exclusion of a particular point defines openness.  Formally, let X be any non-empty set and p ∈ X.  The collection

of subsets of X is then the excluded point topology on X.  There are a variety of cases which are individually named:

 If X has two points, it is called the Sierpiński space. This case is somewhat special and is handled separately.
 If X is finite (with at least 3 points), the topology on X is called the finite excluded point topology
 If X is countably infinite, the topology on X is called the countable  excluded point topology
 If X is uncountable, the topology on X is called the uncountable excluded point topology

This topology is used to provide interesting examples and counterexamples.

Properties 

Let  be a space with the excluded point topology with special point 

The topology is an Alexandrov topology. So the space is locally relatively compact (each point admits a local base of relatively compact neighborhoods) and locally compact in the sense that each point has a local base of compact neighborhoods. But points  do not admit a local base of closed compact neighborhoods.

The space is ultraconnected, as any nonempty closed set contains the point   Therefore the space is also connected and path-connected.

See also 

 Finite topological space
 Fort space
 List of topologies
 Particular point topology

References

Topological spaces